David Chalmers is an Australian philosopher.

David Chalmers may also refer to:

 David Chalmers (Scottish industrialist) (1820–1899) 
 David B. Chalmers Jr (born 1953), American owner of an oil refining company
 David Mark Chalmers (1927–2020), American historian
 David Chalmers (footballer, born 1891) (1891–1920), Scottish football centre forward
 David Chalmers (footballer, born 1897) (1897–1961), Scottish football inside forward
 David Chalmers, Lord Ormond (1530–1592) Scottish law lord and historian and figure of the Scottish Reformation